The Louisiana Department of Health (LDH) (French: Département de La Santé de Louisiane), formerly known as the Louisiana Department of Health and Hospitals (French: Département de La Santé et des Hôpitaux), is a state agency of Louisiana, headquartered in Baton Rouge. It is Louisiana's largest state agency with a budget of $15 billion and approximately 6,300 personnel. The agency oversees the health of the population under its current secretary, Dr. Courtney N. Phillips.

Leadership 
Dr. Courtney N. Phillips was appointed secretary in 2020 by Governor John Bel Edwards. Prior to her role as secretary, she served as executive commissioner of Texas Health and Human Services, which included the Texas Health and Human Services Commission and Texas Department of State Health Services. Before that, she served as chief executive officer of the Nebraska Department of Health and Human Services. She also previously spent 12 years at LDH in a variety of roles, including deputy secretary.

Tonya Joiner serves as deputy secretary, having previously served as chief of staff to the LDH secretary. The deputy secretary is the coordinator for LDH's Regional Coordinating Councils and oversees the coordination and implementation of the 1996 Health Insurance Portability and Accountability Act (HIPAA).

Mission 
The mission of the Louisiana Department of Health is to protect and promote health and to ensure access to medical, preventive and rehabilitative services for all citizens of the state of Louisiana.

Offices of the Louisiana Department of Health 
LDH's agencies include:

 Office of Public Health
 Monitors food and safe drinking water
 Fights chronic and communicable disease
 Ensures readiness for hurricanes, disasters and other threats
 Manages, analyzes and disseminates public health data
 Ensures access to vital records for births, deaths, fetal deaths and Orleans Parish marriage records
 Offers preventive health services
 Office of Behavioral Health
 Manages and delivers supports and services for citizens with mental illness and addictive disorders
 Delivers direct care through hospitalization
 Oversees behavioral health community-based treatment programs through the human services districts and authorities
 Office of Women's Health and Community Health
 Created by Act 676 (SB 116) of the 2022 Regular Legislative Session, and signed by Governor John Bel Edwards on June 18, 2022
 Focuses on health needs throughout a woman’s life, including chronic or acute conditions that significantly affect women, access to healthcare for women, and women’s health disparities
 Includes the Bureau of Community Partnerships & Health Equity, which is responsible for operationalizing community engagement and health equity best practices and standards agency wide
 Office for Citizens with Developmental Disabilities
 Single point of entry into the developmental disabilities services system
 Oversees public and private residential services and other services for people with developmental disabilities
 Office of Aging and Adult Services
 Manages and delivers supports and services for senior citizens and people with adult-onset disabilities
 Provides and enhances services for people in need of long-term care
 Medicaid
 Provides medical benefits to low-income individuals and families
 Expanded under Gov. John Bel Edwards in 2016 through the Patient Protection and Affordable Care Act
 Medicaid expansion has provided nearly 480,000 previously uninsured residents with coverage, dropping the state's uninsured rate to 8.4% in 2017

LDH also plays a role in the State of Louisiana's emergency preparedness network.

Geographic Structure 

The Louisiana Department of Health provides public health services and oversight across Louisiana in nine regions.

*Within the Office of Behavioral Health, Region 1 comprises Orleans, Plaquemines and St. Bernard parishes. An additional Region 10, based in Metairie, serves Jefferson Parish exclusively.

References

External links

Louisiana Department of Health

health
Medical and health organizations based in Louisiana
State departments of health of the United States